Cho or CHO may refer to:

People
 Chief Happiness Officer
 Chief Heat Officer

Surnames

 Cho (Korean surname), one romanization of the common Korean surname 
 Zhuo, romanized Cho in Wade–Giles, Chinese surname
 Cho, a Minnan romanization of the Chinese surname Cao
 Chō, the romaji for the uncommon Japanese surname derived from the Chinese Zhang (Kanji )
 Cho U (born 1980), Taiwanese go player who romanizes his name in the Japanese fashion
 Chō (born 1957), Japanese actor and voice actor
Isamu Chō (1895-1945), Japanese lieutenant general

Characters
 Cho Hakkai, the Japanese name for Zhū Bājiè or "Pigsy", a character in the 16th-century Chinese novel, Journey to the West, by Wu Cheng'en
 Cho Hakkai (Saiyuki), the same character in the manga and anime series Saiyuki, based on the novel

Given name
 Cho Ramaswamy (1934-2016), Indian actor and writer
 Cho, a Burmese given name meaning "sweet" commonly used at the start of a female name and at the end for male names
 Rich Cho (born 1965), American basketball executive
 Ba Cho (1893–1947), Burmese newspaper publisher and politician

Characters
 Cho Chang, a fictional character from the Harry Potter series

Nicknames and stagenames
 Yūichi Nagashima, a Japanese voice actor who goes by the stage name Chō
 CHO, a nickname given to Callum Hudson-Odoi, an English professional footballer

Entertainment
 Center-hand opponent, a term used in the card game bridge: see Glossary of contract bridge terms
Cho (rapper) (born 1993), Dutch rapper
"Chō" (Shizuka Kudo song), 1996
Chō (Tsuki Amano song)

Science and mathematics
 Chinese hamster ovary cell (CHO cell)
 CHO, a mnemonic used to teach trigonometry, showing that the cosecant of an angle in a triangle is the ratio of the length of the hypotenuse over the length opposite side
 cubohemioctahedron, in geometry, is a nonconvex uniform polyhedron
 -CHO, the chemical symbol for an aldehyde
 Carbohydrate, referencing the three constituent elements, carbon (C), Hydrogen (H) and Oxygen (O)

Technology
Chō, an ancient Japanese unit of length approximately equal to 109.1 meters or 357'11"
Chō, also used as a unit of area in Japan approximately 2.449 acres or 0.9917 hectares
Nokia's internal codename for the 6681 mobile phone

Codes
 CHO, the IATA code for Charlottesville–Albemarle Airport in the state of Virginia, US
 cho, the ISO 639-2 and -3 code for the Choctaw language as spoken in the US
 CHO, the National Rail code for Cholsey railway station in the county of Oxfordshire, UK

See also